Big Barn Farm is a British live-action and animated children's comedy television series following the lives of four young animals on a farm which uses a combination of live-action and animation. It was produced by The Foundation and commissioned by Michael Carrington for the BBC children's channel CBeebies. It was narrated by Ben Fairman in the first series and Dave Lamb in the second series.

Setting
The programme is set on a farm and follows the adventures of four young animals: Petal the piglet, Gobo the goat, Dash the donkey and Digger the puppy, who are called the Farmyard Bunch. The storylines are told from the young animals' point of view and revolve around their emotions and the situations they find themselves in. In each adventure the Farmyard Bunch explore their friendships whilst discovering their roles on the farm with help from the other farm animals. Each episode constitutes an individual story, usually involving the main characters getting into some minor difficulty and pulling together to get out of that difficulty. There is no narrative thread to the episodes, each standing on its own without the need for prior understanding or any loose ends at the end.

The series aims to help children understand the importance of friendship, develop knowledge of the world around them and help develop problem solving skills.

Before the show airs, the CBeebies presenter may encourage the young viewers to sing along with the theme song, which is generally sung very fast and provides some basic information about each of the main characters.  The closing song is similar, but longer and details all of the animal characters, including the minor ones.

Characters

The Farmyard Bunch
 Dash (voiced by Ben Fairman) is a young male donkey. Dash is thoughtful, cautious and extremely kind but occasionally a bit stubborn (like most donkeys in real life).  Dash is often wary of any new adventure and would prefer watching the others being brave rather than take part himself. But because of his kind nature, Dash will always end up joining in. Dash isn't as excitable as the others and always likes to think carefully about any new situation. As the tallest of the Farmyard Bunch, Dash can see over the top of things which can be very useful. His catchphrase is, "Calm down, calm down.'
 Gobo (voiced by Elly Fairman) is a young goat or kid. Gobo is clever, very bouncy and eats a lot. Often too quickly which means Gobo burps a lot too! In fact, Gobo thinks about food most of the time and is always happy to nibble on anything! Gobo can be noisy and barges into situations when really Gobo should stop and think first. But if there’s a hay bale that needs climbing or a picnic to be investigated, Gobo will be first in line to give it a go! His catchphrase is "Go, go, Gobo!'
 Petal (voiced by Gemma Harvey) is a female piglet. is a cheeky and daring young piglet who likes to think of herself as leader of the four friends.  Petal is adventurous and brave and usually the first to go and investigate something new. Sometimes this gets her into trouble and at other times Petal sounds braver than Petal really feels. Petal's personality isn't girly so Petal’s just happy splashing in the mud. Her catchphrase is "Piglet Power!"
 Digger (voiced by Shelley Longworth) is a male Labrador Retriever puppy. He is the youngest of the four friends and always eager to prove himself. Digger is very cute, naive and willing to please. The puppy has boundless energy and will always be the first to volunteer for any new adventure, however, he isn't very bright and so doesn't come up with as many ideas as the others and sometimes takes a while to catch on to what's happening, but he is always eager to please and is never happier when playing with his friends. His catchphrase is "I can do that! I can do that!".

Minor characters
The main characters around the farm include:
 Mack the Horse (voiced by Mike Winsor), who’s the tallest on the farm and is friends with The Farmyard Bunch and Wizard the Owl (voiced by Mike Winsor).
 Madame the Cow (voiced by Kate O'Sullivan), who’s the most helpful to the Farmyard Bunch and loves French so much.
 Mrs. Snuffles the Pig (voiced by Kate O'Sullivan), who’s Petal’s caring mother and would do anything to keep her daughter, her sons and her potato peelings.
 The Mrs. Chickens (voiced by Kate O'Sullivan), who’re the one’s who gossip all day it can just get the farm very annoyed but at same time they’re very busy with their chicks they give their feathers a real ache.
 Mrs. Paws the Cat (voiced by Carla Mendoncathe),who’s the silent night walker of the farm who cares for her litter of kittens.
 The Duck Girls (voiced by Kate O'Sullivan), are several female ducks who live at the farm pond. They are very vain and always fuss about their feathers.
 Old Pop is a Shepherd male dog whose job is to keep everyone on the farm safe. Voiced by Mike Winsor and Keith Wickham in the episode Old Pop's got to go only.
 Ewenice, (voiced by Kate O'Sullivan), is a female sheep.
 Lester, is a very serious male rooster who crows at Dawn every day of the year. Voiced by Keith Wickham.
 Narrator, is the one who can see all of Big Barn Farm but the animals can’t even hear him. In season 1 he’s played by Ben Fairman, and in season 2 they change the actor to Dave Lamb.

There are also several human characters who feature in the programme, but do not speak, the farmer (played by Chris Noel), the farmer's wife (played by Laura Wyles), the farmer's son (played by Reef Matthews), and the farmer's daughter (played by Katie Parks).

Production
Big Barn Farm was created and produced by The Foundation, which is part of the RDF Media group, the programme combines footage of real animals with animation. The visual effects were created by Ian Carley, at iCarley Media, and James Kearsley, at JK Studios, using 450 individual shots of talking animals. The Executive Producer for Cbeebies was Sarah Colclough.

The set was created around a flint stable block and a barn which were not part of a real working farm. The animals lived on set or nearby during filming.

The production filmed at Stede Court Estate near Maidstone in Kent.

A DVD of Big Barn Farm, titled "Welcome to Big Barn Farm" was released on 17 November 2008.

Episodes

Academic analysis
Professor Steven Fielding of the University of Nottingham analyses the political themes of the episode 'Lester the Leader' in his 2014 work 'A State of Play' which examines how people's views on politics are constructed by fictional representations of politics.

References

External links
 
 http://www.bigbarnfarm.com/
 https://web.archive.org/web/20080611095807/http://www.foundationtv.co.uk/images/bigbarnfarmhold.html
 https://web.archive.org/web/20081210232204/http://www.bbc.co.uk/cbeebies/bigbarnfarm/
 http://www.bbcshop.com/Children's/Welcome-To-Big-Barn-Farm-DVD/invt/2edvd0313

2000s British children's television series
2010s British children's television series
2008 British television series debuts
2010 British television series endings
BBC children's television shows
British preschool education television series
Fictional farms
British television series with live action and animation
Television series about mammals
Television shows set in England
English-language television shows
CBeebies